Arleen Sorkin (born October 14, 1955) is a retired American actress, screenwriter, presenter and comedian. Sorkin is known for portraying Calliope Jones on the NBC daytime serial Days of Our Lives and for inspiring and voicing the DC Comics villain Harley Quinn, created by her college friend Paul Dini, in Batman: The Animated Series and the many animated series and video games that followed it.

Early life, family and education   
Sorkin was born in Washington, D.C.  Her family is Jewish.

Career 
Sorkin began her career in cabaret in the late 1970s and early 1980s as a member of the comedy group The High-Heeled Women, alongside Mary Fulham, Tracey Berg, and Cassandra Danz. 

One of her more prominent roles was the wacky but lovable Calliope Jones, as seen on Days of Our Lives. She played this part from 1984 to 1990 and made return visits in 1992 and 2001. She reprised her role on the soap for the fourth time on February 24, 2006. She returned to Days for a limited run beginning on May 5, 2010.

From 1987 to 1989, Sorkin played Geneva, a sexy maid to yuppie couple Richard and Linda Phillips, on the Fox dramedy series Duet. She would reprise this role on one episode of Open House, the sequel series to Duet. She was the original female co-host on America's Funniest People in 1990. In 1992, Sorkin was dismissed from America's Funniest People by producer Vin Di Bona. In response, Sorkin filed a lawsuit against Di Bona, claiming she was dismissed from the show due to her race, after ABC Chairman Dan Burke had suggested to Di Bona that Sorkin be replaced by an African-American or a person of another ethnic minority. Sorkin sought $450,000 for lost earnings, and an additional unspecified amount for harm to her professional reputation and emotional injury. She additionally claimed that after she denounced the move as being racially motivated, Di Bona changed plans and hired new cohost Tawny Kitaen, who was also white.

Sorkin's writing included for the Tiny Toon Adventures 1990–1992 television series, and co-writer of the story and screenplay of the 1997 Jennifer Aniston film, Picture Perfect.

She provided inspiration for and voiced the animated character Harley Quinn, a sidekick and lover to the Joker, first appearing in a 1992 episode of Batman: The Animated Series. Quinn was created by Paul Dini, a college friend of Sorkin's, who partly modeled the character after her personality and mannerisms. Though Harley Quinn was originally intended to appear in a single episode, reaction to the character and Sorkin's voice performance was positive, so Quinn was written into the show regularly. Quinn went on to appear in DC comic books and in further animated TV series including The New Batman Adventures, Static Shock, and Justice League, as well as Gotham Girls, an internet cartoon series. Sorkin also voiced Harley in the animated film Batman Beyond: Return of the Joker and multiple video games. Following DC Universe Online, Sorkin retired from voicing Harley Quinn and therefore did not reprise her role in any subsequent DC projects. The character was subsequently voiced by several actresses, usually Tara Strong or Hynden Walch, in various media.

For the series Frasier (1993-2004), produced by her husband Christopher Lloyd, Sorkin would perform as a caller to Frasier Crane's radio show; the lines would later be dubbed over by a celebrity caller. In the final episode of Frasier, Sorkin makes an onscreen part as the owner of a monkey.

Personal life
Since 1995, Sorkin has been married to television writer-producer Christopher Lloyd, with whom she has two sons, Eli and Owen.

Filmography

Film

Television

Video games

Writer

Awards and nominations

References

External links
 

1955 births
Living people
American film actresses
American television actresses
American soap opera actresses
American television personalities
American women television personalities
American video game actresses
American voice actresses
American television writers
American women television writers
Actresses from Washington, D.C.
20th-century American actresses
21st-century American actresses
Jewish American actresses
Screenwriters from Washington, D.C.
21st-century American Jews